Roger Skogheim Kleivdal (born 13 March 1988) is a Norwegian snowboarder who competes for the club NTG Geilo. He represented Norway at the 2010 Winter Olympics in Vancouver.

References

External links

1988 births
Living people
Norwegian male snowboarders
Olympic snowboarders of Norway
Snowboarders at the 2010 Winter Olympics
21st-century Norwegian people